Poplar Creek (also recorded as Polar Creek) is an unincorporated community in Montgomery County, Mississippi. On April 27, 2011, a tornado hit the Poplar Creek area as part of the 2011 Super Outbreak, causing heavy tree and power line damage.

References

Unincorporated communities in Montgomery County, Mississippi
Unincorporated communities in Mississippi